Indalmus lachrymosus, is a species of handsome fungus beetle found in Sri Lanka.

Description
Elytron with longitudinal red stripe which is widely interrupted. There are 2 longitudinal patches in elytra, one near base, the other near apex.

References 

Endomychidae
Insects of Sri Lanka
Insects described in 1925